Marc Hosemann (born 20 August 1970 in Hamburg), is a German actor.

Filmography (selection) 
 Alles außer Mord (1996, TV)
 Short Sharp Shock (1998)
 Long Hello and Short Goodbye (1999)
 Investigating Sex (2001)
 Jargo (2004)
  (2006)
 Black Sheep (2006)
 Das Beste kommt erst (2008)
 Soul Kitchen (2009)
 Die Gänsemagd (2009, TV)
 Zweiohrküken (2009)
 A Coffee In Berlin (2012)
  (2012)
 Alarm für Cobra 11 - Die Autobahnpolizei (2014, 2018)
 Tatort: Frühstück für immer (2014)
  (2015)
 Goodbye Berlin (2016)
 Parfum (2018)
 The Golden Glove (2019)

References

External links
 

1968 births
Living people
Male actors from Hamburg
German male stage actors
German male film actors
German male television actors
20th-century German male actors
21st-century German male actors